Daizangi is one of the large and historical residential areas of Hazaristan (Hazarajat) which is located in the central regions of Afghanistan.

Geography 
Daizangi includes Panjab (Bamyan), Waras (Bamyan), Yakawlang (Bamyan), Lal Sarjangal (Ghor) and part of Sharistan (Daikundi).

Demographics 
The residents of Dairangi are Hazara people who speak Hazaragi and Dari dialects of the Persian.

Famous people from Daizangi 
 Abdul Ali Mazari
 Qorban Kohestani
 Zahir Howaida
 General Khodaidad
 Murad Ali Murad
 Jafar Mahdavi
 Safdar Tawakoli

See also 
 Daizangi tribe

References 

Hazarajat
Hazara people